The Diva is a 1929 German silent comedy film directed by Kurt Blachy.

The film's art direction was by Leopold Blonder.

Cast
In alphabetical order

References

External links

1929 films
Films of the Weimar Republic
Films directed by Kurt Blachy
German silent feature films
German black-and-white films
German comedy films
1929 comedy films
Silent comedy films
1920s German films
1920s German-language films